, also known as , is a multi-purpose stadium in Yokohama, Kanagawa Prefecture, Japan, which opened in March 1998. It is the home stadium of Yokohama F. Marinos of the J1 League.

International Stadium Yokohama had the highest seating capacity of any stadium in Japan for 21 years, with a total of 75,000 seats, up until the New National Stadium in Tokyo was opened in November 2019. It hosted three group stage games during the 2002 FIFA World Cup, and the final game between Germany and Brazil was played there on 30 June 2002. The stadium was one of the football venues for the 2020 Summer Olympics. The stadium was a venue for the 2019 Rugby World Cup and eventually hosted the final of the tournament after the originally selected host, National Stadium was unable to be constructed in time.

On 28 August 2009, Nissan Motors announced that they would not renew the contract for the naming rights of the stadium, which expired on 28 February 2010. But negotiations continued with the city, and a new agreement for three more years was completed. On 28 February 2013, Yokohama City as the stadium's owner renewed the contract for 3 years from 1 March 2013 until 29 February 2016 in a deal worth 150 million yen a year. On 1 December 2015, Yokohama City renewed the contract for 5 years from 1 March 2016 until 28 February 2021 in another deal worth 150 million yen a year. On 26 February 2021, Yokohama City renewed the contract for another 5 years from 1 March 2021 to 28 February 2026 in a deal worth 600 million yen (120 million yen per year).

FIFA Club World Cup 
International Stadium Yokohama has been hosting the FIFA Club World Cup since 2003, first as European/South American Intercontinental Cup and later the Club World Cup.

The first edition held in Yokohama was the match between Real Madrid and Olimpia, where Real were crowned champions. In 2005, the old Intercontinental Cup was replaced to the new World Championship involving football teams, the FIFA Club World Cup, with more teams and matches.

One of the venues, including the final, from 2005 to the 2008, from 2011 to the 2012 and from 2015 to the 2016 editions was the International Stadium Yokohama.

Music events

Some Japanese musicians have played at this stadium. "Arena seats" are often set up on the track and ground. In 1999, Japanese best-selling rock band B'z first used the stadium as a music events. Then, B'z used the stadium three times in 2002, 2008 and 2013. Heavy metal band X Japan performed two consecutive nights on 14–15 August 2010. Their former bass player Taiji joined them both nights, the first, and only, time since he left the group in 1992. Attendance for both concerts was estimated at 140,000. The Japanese girl group AKB48 was the first ever female act to hold their concert at the stadium on 8 June 2013 followed by Momoiro Clover Z on 4 August 2013. They also held their fifth annual Senbatsu (AKB48 32nd Single's Selected Members) Election at the stadium in that evening after concert. South Korean group TVXQ performed at the stadium on 17 and 18 August 2013, as part of their Time: Live Tour 2013. Attendance for both concerts was estimated at 140,000. Tohoshinki announced three shows at Nissan Stadium (Total 5), as a grand finale of the tour Begin Again, thus becoming the only foreign artists to perform at the venue twice, as well as the first artists to hold concerts at Nissan Stadium across three consecutive days on 8, 9 and 10 June 2018, Attendance for three concerts was estimated at 225,000.  Nogizaka46 will hold group 10th debut anniversary concert on May 14–15, 2022.

Notable football matches 
The stadium has hosted several international FIFA matches. Here is a list of the most important international and other matches held at the stadium.

2001 FIFA Confederations Cup

2002 FIFA World Cup

Intercontinental Cup

2005 FIFA Club World Championship

2006 FIFA Club World Cup

2007 FIFA Club World Cup

2008 FIFA Club World Cup

2011 FIFA Club World Cup

2012 FIFA Club World Cup

A minute's silence was held before the match to commemorate Dutch linesman Richard Nieuwenhuizen, who had died following a violent incident at a youth competition four days before the match.

2015 FIFA Club World Cup

2016 FIFA Club World Cup

Kirin Cup/Kirin Challenge Cup

2019 J.League World Challenge

2019 EuroJapan Cup

Football at the 2020 Summer Olympics
Men's tournament

Women's tournament

International rugby matches 

Notes:
 Asaeli Ai Valu, Kazuki Himeno, Fetuani Lautaimi, Sione Teaupa and Wimpie van der Walt (all Japan) and Matt Philip (Australia) made their international debuts.
 Ben McCalman (Australia) earned his 50th test cap.

Notes:
 Sonny Bill Williams (New Zealand) earned his 50th test cap.
 Sekope Kepu (Australia) became the ninth Australian to earn his 100th test cap and the first in his position for his country.

2019 Rugby World Cup

References

External links

Nissan Stadium
Stadium Guide Article
FIFA Profile

Sports venues in Yokohama
Yokohama, International Stadium
Venues of the 2020 Summer Olympics
2001 FIFA Confederations Cup stadiums in Japan
Yokohama, International Stadium
Yokohama, International Stadium
Yokohama F. Marinos
Athletics (track and field) venues in Japan
Nissan
Sports venues completed in 1998
Olympic football venues
Venues of the 2026 Asian Games
1998 establishments in Japan